Robert Kinloch "Bob" Massie IV (born August 17, 1956) is an American activist, author, and politician who works on issues of global leadership and corporate accountability, social justice, and climate change. He has created or led several organizations, including Ceres, the Global Reporting Initiative, the Investor Network on Climate Risk, and the New Economy Coalition. His early activism centered on opposition to South Africa's apartheid regime, writing the about the relationship between the US and South Africa in the apartheid era.

In 1994, Massie won the Democratic nomination for Lieutenant Governor of Massachusetts, running on a ticket with Mark Roosevelt, but lost in that year's general election. In 2018, he was a candidate for the Democratic nomination to be governor of Massachusetts, and was endorsed by Our Revolution, Massachusetts Peace Action, 350 Action, and a number of other progressive organizations and groups. He lost the primary to Jay Gonzalez, a cabinet official in Deval Patrick's administration.

Early life and education
Born in New York City, Massie is the son of historians Robert K. Massie, winner of the 1981 Pulitzer Prize for biography; and Suzanne Massie, who worked in forming the relationship between Ronald Reagan and Mikhail Gorbachev.

Massie was born with severe classic hemophilia. As a result of this, his father, Robert Massie Sr., wrote Nicholas and Alexandra (1967), a biography of Tsar Nicholas II and his family, which was produced as the movie Nicholas and Alexandra four years later. Massie's parents also wrote a more personal account of their son's challenges, titled Journey. Because of his childhood health issues, Massie spent ages six through twelve in leg braces and a wheelchair. The family spent a few years living in France, where Massie's healthcare was covered by the French government, and he was able to regain the ability to walk.

Massie entered Princeton University, graduating magna cum laude in 1978 with a degree in history. As an officer of his alumni class he established the Class of 1978 Foundation, one of the first university foundations to fund direct summer service for students.

While at Princeton he was active in the student movement for Princeton's divestiture from South Africa, and campaigned for equal access to university dining clubs, many of which did not admit women as members.

After graduating from Princeton, he received his Master of Divinity (M.Div.) degree from Yale in 1982. He received a Doctor of Business Administration from Harvard in 1989.

Professional career
After completing school, Massie became ordained as an Episcopal priest, and became a chaplain at New York City's Grace Episcopal Church, where he founded a homeless shelter. He later served as a chaplain at Christ Episcopal Church in Somerville, Massachusetts.

From 1989 to 1996 Massie lectured at Harvard Divinity School, and served as Director of the Project on Business Values and the Economy there.

In 1993 Massie received a Senior Fulbright Research Award to spend time in South Africa, where he taught at the University of Cape Town. In 1994 he also served as an official international observer during the first democratic elections in South Africa. His book Loosing the Bonds: The United States and South Africa In the Apartheid Years was completed over the next four years, and published by Doubleday in 1997. It won the Lionel Gelber Prize for the Best Book on International Relations in 1998 and was reviewed favorably across the United States, including the New York Times.

From 1996 to 2003 Massie served as the Executive Director of Ceres, a coalition of environmental groups and institutional investors in the United States.

He also proposed and led the creation of the Investor Network on Climate Risk and the Institutional Investor Summit on Climate Risk, a gathering of public and private sector financial leaders held every two years at UN Headquarters in New York City. At the most recent meeting of the INCR, global investors and pension funds worth more than $22 trillion explored the financial dangers of climate change and pressed for a tripling of investment in clean energy technology to reach an annual goal of $1 trillion a year.

In 1998, in partnership with the United Nations and major U.S. foundations, he co-founded the Global Reporting Initiative (GRI) with Allen White. According to the most recent 2017 database, 10,613 organizations have produced 40,155 reports of which 26,675 are GRI reports.

In 2002, Massie was named one of the 100 most influential people in the field of finance by CFO magazine. In the same year, he learned that he had contracted hepatitis C from contaminated blood medications used to treat his hemophilia. He resigned from Ceres in order to pursue medical treatment.

Massie founded and co-chaired the Massachusetts Energy Efficiency Coalition, and in 2010 led a campaign against slot machine and casino gambling in Massachusetts. In that year he was awarded the Damyanova Prize for Corporate Social Responsibility by the Institute for Global Leadership at Tufts University, and in April, 2009 he received the Joan Bavaria Innovation and Impact Awards for Building Sustainability in Capital Markets.

In March 2012, Massie became the president of the New Economy Coalition, then called the New Economics Institute, an organization dedicated to moving the American economy toward greater justice and sustainability. He stepped down as president in October 2014.

His autobiography, A Song in the Night: A Memoir of Resilience, was published in 2012 by Nan Talese/Doubleday books.

In May 2014, Massie called on Harvard University to divest its endowment from fossil fuel corporations in an op-ed for The Harvard Crimson. He continued to devote time to the New Economy Coalition.

In November 2015 Massie became the executive director of the Sustainable Solutions Lab at UMass Boston.

Political career
In 1975 Massie began working in public politics with a job in the office of U.S. Senator Henry M. Jackson. In 1994 he won the statewide primary election and became the Democratic candidate for Lieutenant Governor of Massachusetts. The Democratic ticket was defeated by incumbent Republican governor Bill Weld.

In January 2011, Massie declared his candidacy for the United States Senate election in Massachusetts, 2012. In April 2011, Democratic strategist Joe Trippi joined the Massie campaign. Massie ended his campaign on October 7, citing the entrance of Elizabeth Warren into the race.

During the 2016 Democratic Party presidential primary, Massie supported Bernie Sanders.

2018 gubernatorial campaign
On May 16, 2017, Massie began a campaign for the Democratic nomination in the Massachusetts gubernatorial election, 2018. His platform, he said, focused on climate change initiatives, workers' rights and economic equality. He lost the primary election on September 4, 2018.

2020 Massachusetts Democratic Party chair campaign
In October 2020, Massie announced that he was running for election to a four-year term as chair of the Massachusetts Democratic Party, and posted a YouTube video about his candidacy. Massie was defeated by incumbent chair Gus Bickford.

Personal life
In 1984 he was diagnosed with HIV, which he had contracted in 1978, from medical injections. By 1994 he was one of the longest survivors with HIV and offered his case to Dr. Bruce D. Walker at Massachusetts General Hospital for review. Extensive study of Massie's blood has contributed to research and treatment studies around the world, and he was the subject of a NOVA documentary in 1999. In 1996 and 2002 Massie had surgeries to replace his knee joints, damaged from the repetitive joint bleeds.

In June 2009, Massie received a liver transplant, in a procedure performed at Emory University Hospital in Atlanta, which cured not only his hepatitis C, but also his hemophilia. The clotting factor in blood is produced in the liver.

After graduation from Yale he met and married Dana L. Robert in November 1980, with whom he had two sons, Sam (born 1987), and John (b. 1989). The couple divorced in 1995. In 1997 Massie married Anne Tate, an architect and professor at Rhode Island School of Design, with whom he has a daughter, Katherine (b. 1998).

References

External links
 Ceres website
 Global Reporting Initiative website
 Bob Massie Campaign website
 New Economics Institute website

1956 births
American Episcopal priests
American male writers
American people of Swiss descent
Harvard Business School alumni
Liver transplant recipients
Living people
Princeton University alumni
Massachusetts Democrats
People with HIV/AIDS
Recipients of contaminated haemophilia blood products
People with haemophilia
Yale Divinity School alumni